is a member of the Hokkaido Legislative Assembly, representing Sapporo's Higashi-ku ward. She is the first openly trans person to hold a prefectural assembly position in Japan.

Life 
Fuchigami was born in Ogi, Saga Prefecture, on 16 January 1975. In March 1993, she graduated from the Ogi Prefectural High School.

Fuchigami was elected to the post she now occupies in April 2019.

See also
 List of transgender people
 Aya Kamikawa

References 

Living people
1975 births
21st-century Japanese women politicians
21st-century Japanese politicians
Transgender politicians
Transgender women
Japanese LGBT politicians
Members of the Hokkaido Prefectural Assembly
21st-century LGBT people